İpek Soylu and Xu Yifan were the defending champions, but did not participate this year.

Duan Yingying and Han Xinyun won the title, defeating Lu Jingjing and Zhang Shuai in the final 6–2, 6–1.

Players

Draw

Final

Lotus group

Orchid group

References

Doubles Draw

WTA Elite Trophy
WTA Elite Trophy
2017 in Chinese tennis